Audubon Township (T10+N½T9N R1W) is located in Montgomery County, Illinois, United States. As of the 2010 census, its population was 552 and it contained 253 housing units.

Geography

Demographics

Adjacent townships
 Rosamond Township, Christian County (north)
 Pana Township, Christian County (northeast)
 Oconee Township, Shelby County (east)
 Ramsey Township, Fayette County (southeast)
 North Hurricane Township, Fayette County (south)
 Witt Township (southwest)
 Nokomis Township (west)
 Greenwood Township, Christian County (northwest)

References

External links
City-data.com
Illinois State Archives
Historical Society of Montgomery County Illinois

Townships in Montgomery County, Illinois
1872 establishments in Illinois
Townships in Illinois